Death Warrant is a 1990 American prison action thriller film directed by Deran Sarafian and produced by Mark di Salle. The film was written by David S. Goyer while a student at USC, and was Goyer's first screenplay to be sold and produced commercially. In the film, police detective Louis Burke is going into a prison facility in California as an undercover cop in order to find out who was behind a mysterious series of murders, and finds himself locked up with his nemesis: Christian Naylor, a psychotic serial killer who calls himself "The Sandman," who sets out to exact revenge upon him after getting into prison.

Death Warrant was released on September 14, 1990. Upon its release, the film grossed $46 million against a production budget of only $6 million. The film received general mixed critical reaction from critics who found the direction, its storyline, villain, and the plot poor, but highly praised the acting as well as the action scenes and the thrilling atmosphere.

Plot
Detective Louis Burke (Jean-Claude van Damme) of the Royal Canadian Mounted Police from Quebec confronts the maniac that killed his partner on the force: an enigmatic psychopathic serial killer by the name of Christian Naylor (Patrick Kilpatrick), who calls himself "The Sandman". Burke searches an abandoned house in Los Angeles, where he comes across a series of bodies hanging from the ceiling, and is then attacked by the Sandman. Burke is able to shoot the Sandman several times in the center of his chest, apparently killing him.

Sixteen months later, Burke joins a task force assembled by the governor to investigate a series of murders in the Harrison State Prison in California which is becoming a scandal threatening his reelection. While Burke poses as an inmate, attorney Amanda Beckett (Cynthia Gibb) acts as his wife.

Burke goes undercover and is interned in the State penitentiary, where he befriends his cellmate Konefke (Conrad Dunn) and a clerk, Hawkins (Robert Guillaume). Despite Burke saving Hawkins from a confrontation with a Mexican gang, neither he nor Konefke will talk about the recent murders. Burke is able to track down the cellmate of the most recent victim (named Barrett), who works at the infirmary, but the cellmate also refuses to talk. When Burke threatens him, he reveals that he doesn't know what's going on, but that the guards are involved and that there is an "outside man." He sends Burke to talk to Priest (Abdul Salaam El Razzac), who gets him a key to the records room.

In the records room, Burke finds Barrett's death certificate covered in codes. He feeds the codes to Beckett and connects her with a teenage hacker, Tisdale (Joshua John Miller), who determines the codes come from the infirmary. With help from Priest and Hawkins, Burke breaks into the infirmary and finds several boxes labeled "medical waste" that are actually full of human organs.

Later, a new inmate arrives, and Burke is horrified to find that it's the Sandman, who did not die two years ago. The Sandman recognizes Burke and briefly apprehends him; instead of killing Burke, the Sandman reveals to their fellow prisoners that Burke is a cop.

Meanwhile, Beckett and Tisdale are able to decipher a code they find in the computer, which comprises prisoner identification numbers followed by their blood type. None of the inmates on the list have drug-related crimes, and they are mostly young, first-time offenders. All of the ID numbers match those of prisoners who have been murdered. Beckett identifies it as a "hit list", and tips off Burke that he's next on the list.

On the outside, Beckett then attends a party hosted by the state's attorney general, Tom Vogler (George Dickerson). Beckett believes that her boss, Ben Keane (Jack Bannon), is responsible for the murders, and prepares to tell Vogler of her theory. However, just as she is about to do so, she receives a call from Tisdale, who tells her that the man behind the murders is in fact Vogler.

Vogler produces a gun and reveals to Beckett that his wife needed a liver transplant, and when it turned out that even his money and influence couldn't move her up the donor list in time, he created a conspiracy to murder healthy prisoners for organs. After his wife's transplant, he continued the scheme for profit. He also reveals that he sent the Sandman to assassinate Burke, because Burke was too hard for the other inmates to kill. When his wife unexpectedly enters the room, Beckett escapes.

In the prison, Burke escapes his cell and the Sandman opens all the other cells to create a riot. Priest and Hawkins help him evade the guards; Hawkins is injured but saved by Priest, but Priest is then killed by the Sandman. The scene culminates in a showdown between Sandman and Burke with the inmates looking on. At first, the Sandman gets the better of the fight, but when he opens the door to the boiler room—proclaiming, "Welcome to hell!"—Burke turns the tables by kicking the Sandman into the flames.

This appears to be the end of the Sandman, but after some seconds, he emerges from the boiler, grossly burned. Burke kicks him again, this time sending him careering backward into a pillar, where his head is impaled on a valve stem. Despite this mortal injury, stuck to the valve, the Sandman continues to taunt Burke: "You can't kill me, Burke. I'm the Sandman."

Burke responds by twisting the Sandman's head around; the valve stem inflicts damage on the psychopath's brain, finally killing him. The inmates quietly allow Burke to leave the prison, where he is reunited with Hawkins and Beckett.

Cast 

 Jean-Claude Van Damme as Detective Louis Burke
 Robert Guillaume as Hawkins
 Cynthia Gibb as Amanda Beckett
 George Dickerson as Tom Vogler
 Art LaFleur as Sergeant De Graff
 Patrick Kilpatrick as Christian "The Sandman" Naylor
 Abdul Salaam El-Razzac as Priest
 Armin Shimerman as Dr. Gottesman 
 Joshua John Miller as Douglas Tisdale
 Larry Hankin as Mayerson
 Hank Stone as Romaker
 Conrad Dunn as Konefke
 Joe Dassa as Cop With Inmate

Production

Development and writing
The film was originally known as Dusted. It was the second script ever written by David S. Goyer and the first one he sold.

Filming
Filming started August 1989.

Reception

Box office
The film debuted strongly at the box office, opening with a $5 million weekend to place No. 3. It would gross over $16 million at the domestic box office.

Critical response
On Metacritic the film has a weighted average score of 34 out of 100, based on 9 critics, indicating "generally unfavorable reviews".

References

External links

1990 films
1990 action thriller films
American action thriller films
American serial killer films
American martial arts films
American prison films
1990 martial arts films
American films about revenge
Films directed by Deran Sarafian
Films scored by Gary Chang
Films with screenplays by David S. Goyer
Films set in California
Metro-Goldwyn-Mayer films
Films shot from the first-person perspective
1990s English-language films
1990s American films